The Minister of Justice, also known as the Minister of Justice, Keeper of the Seals (Ministre de la Justice, garde des Sceaux), is a cabinet position in the Government of France. The current Minister of Justice has been Éric Dupond-Moretti since 2020. The ministry is headquartered on Place Vendôme in the 1st arrondissement of Paris.

Function
The roles of the minister are to:
 oversee the building, maintenance and administration of courts;
 sit as vice president of the Judicial Council (which oversees the judicial performance and advises on prosecutiorial performance);
 supervise public prosecutions;
 direct corrections and the prison system
 propose legislation affecting civil or criminal law or procedure.

The Minister of Justice also holds the ceremonial office of Keeper of the Seals of France and is custodian of the Great Seal of France. This symbolic role is still shown in the order of words of the minister's official designation, Minister of Justice, Keeper of the Seals (Ministre de la Justice, garde des Sceaux).

France's Ministry of Justice might oversee the administration of justice in French Guiana, French Polynesia, Guadeloupe, Jersey, Martinique, Mayotte, New Caledonia, Réunion, Saint Barthélemy, Saint-Martin, Saint Pierre and Miquelon and Wallis and Futuna.

List of ministers

See also
 Ministry of Justice (France)
 List of Ministers of Justice of France
 Prison conditions in France

References

External links
 Ministry of Justice 
 Living in Detention – Handbook for New Inmates – French Prison Service 

 
Justice
France
France